Crișeni is a commune in Sălaj County, Crișana, Romania. It consists of three villages: Crișeni, Cristur-Crișeni (Szilágyfőkeresztúr) and Gârceiu (Szilágygörcsön).

Crișeni village was founded in 1387. The local economy consists of crafts, services, agriculture, trade and tourism.

Population
2,443 people 
63% Romanian
32% Hungarian
4% Roma

Sights 
 Reformed Church in Cristur-Crișeni, built in the late 16th century, historic monument

References

Communes in Sălaj County
Localities in Crișana